
Oscar Theodore Broneer (December 28, 1894  – February 22, 1992) was a prominent Swedish American educator and archaeologist known in particular for his work on Ancient Greece. He is most associated with his discovery of the Temple of Isthmia, an important Panhellenic shrine dating from the seventh century B.C.

Biography
Broneer was born in the parish of Bäckebo  in Kalmar County, Sweden. Broneer was the youngest son of a rural farm family. He left Sweden in 1913 for the United States. He first studied at Augustana College and then attended the University of California, Berkeley where it took Broneer only two years to earn both an M.A. and Ph.D. Broneer was professor of archaeology, classical languages and literature at the University of Chicago from 1949 until his retirement in 1960. He also served as director of the university excavations at Isthmia. Additionally he held visiting professorships at the University of California at Los Angeles and Stanford University.

Broneer taught at the American School of Classical Studies at Athens and worked for years at the Corinth Excavations.  In the late 1930s, he worked in Northern Greece and described the re-erection of the monumental Lion of Amphipolis in the book The Lion of Amphipolis published in 1941. He returned to an impoverished Greece after the end of World War II as a member of the International Red Cross. In 1947, he also directed Triumph Over Time, a  documentary short film issued as a fundraiser by the American School of Classical Studies in Athens. While working at Corinth he also developed the first systematic typology of ancient terracotta lamps. 

In 1952, Broneer famously discovered the temple of Poseidon at Isthmia on the very first day of the excavation. He published his findings in a series of three volumes: Isthmia, Vol. 1, Temple of Poseidon (1971), Isthmia, Vol. 2, Topography and Architecture  (1973) and Isthmia, Vol. 3, Terracotta Lamps  (1977). Broneer became the field director at Isthmia in 1952 and remained in charge until 1967.   He died in Corinth, Greece and was buried in Hagia Anna cemetery beside his first wife, Verna Anderson, who died in 1948. The papers of Oscar Broneer are maintained at the  American School of Classical Studies at Athens

Honors
In 1962, the Greek government  honored him with the honorary command of the Royal Hellenic Order of the Phoenix. He received the Gold Medal of the Archaeological Institute of America in 1969. He was honorary vice president of the Archaeological Association of Greece and an honorary member of the International Olympic Committee. He was awarded membership in the German Archaeological Institute and the Royal Swedish Academy of Letters, History and Antiquities.

Selected works
A critical interpretation of Plato's Republic, II 357A-362C (1922)
Corinth IV, ii: Terracotta Lamps (1930)
Corinth X: The Odeum  (1932)
Acrocorinth: excavations in 1926   (1930)
Corinth I, iv: The South Stoa and Its Roman Successors (1954) 
Note: His full bibliography can be found in Hesperia: The Journal of the American School of Classical Studies at Athens Volume 43, Issue 4 (1974).

Gallery

See also
 Ancient Corinth

References

External links
Oscar Broneer Fellowship, American School of Classical Studies at Athens and American Academy in Rome 
Oscar Broneer Memorial Lecture, Archaeological Institute of America

1894 births
1992 deaths
People from Nybro Municipality
Swedish emigrants to the United States
Swedish archaeologists
University of California, Berkeley alumni
Augustana College (Illinois) alumni
University of Chicago faculty
Recipients of the Order of the Phoenix (Greece)
20th-century American archaeologists